The following is a timeline of the history of the city of Mulhouse, France.

Prior to 20th century

 1273 – Mulhouse becomes an Imperial Free City of the Holy Roman Empire and receives privileges from Rudolph of Hapsburg.
 1466 – Mulhouse "formed an alliance with the Swiss."
 1515 – Mulhouse becomes part of the Swiss Confederacy.
 1528 – Protestant reformation.
 1553 –  (city hall) rebuilt.
 1674 – Battle of Mulhouse.
 1746 – Cotton manufacturing begins.
 1798 – Mulhouse becomes part of France per treaty.
 1800 – Population: 6,018.
 1801 – Mulhouse becomes part of the Haut-Rhin department.
 1826 –  founded.
 1830 – Rhone–Rhine Canal built.
 1836 – Population: 16,932.
 1839 - Mulhouse-Ville station opened.
 1849 –  built.
 1853 – Cité ouvrière (residential area for factory workers) developed.
 1856 – Population: 45,981.
 1857
 Paris–Mulhouse railway begins operating.
  (museum) founded.
 1859 - Temple Saint-Étienne founded.
 1861 –  and  created.
 1864 – Musée des Beaux-Arts de Mulhouse established.
 1866 – Population: 58,773.
 1867 – Théâtre de la Sinne built.
 1868 - Mulhouse Zoological and Botanical Park created.
 1871 – Mulhouse becomes part of German Empire.
 1874 – Musée historique de Mulhouse established.
 1880 – Population: 68,140.
 1882 –  begins operating.

20th century
 1906 – Population: 94,498.
 1914
 7–10 August: Battle of Mulhouse; German forces win.
 19 August: .
  becomes part of Mulhouse.
 1919 – Mulhouse becomes part of France again.
 1923 – Société d'histoire de Mulhouse (history society) founded.
 1925 –  built.
 1932 – Gare de Mulhouse (train station) built.
 1940
 June: German occupation of city begins.
 August: Frontstalag 213 prisoner-of-war camp for Allied POWs established by the Germans.
 December: Frontstalag 213 POW camp dissolved. Stalag V-E POW camp established.
 1942 – March: Stalag V-E POW camp dissolved.
 1944 – November: German occupation of city ends.
 1947 – Bourtzwiller becomes part of Mulhouse.
 1955 –  (museum) active.
 1958 –  and  created.
 1959 – 1959 Tour de France bicycle race departs from Mulhouse.
 1962 – Population: 108,995.
 1971
 1971 Tour de France bicycle race departs from Mulhouse.
 Musée français du chemin de fer (train museum) established.
 1972 – Regional Opéra national du Rhin established.
 1978 - Cité de l'Automobile established.
 1986 –  (library) established.
 1989 – Jean-Marie Bockel becomes mayor.
 1992 –  (museum) opens.
 1999 – Kinepolis Mulhouse (cinema) opens.

21st century

 2006 – Mulhouse tramway begins operating.
 2009 – Mulhouse Alsace Agglomération (regional government) created.
 2010
  begins operating.
 Jean Rottner becomes mayor.
 2013
 June: City hosts the 2013 Men's World Team Squash Championships.
 Population: 112,063.
 2015 – Cantons 1, 2, and 3 created.
 2016 – Mulhouse becomes part of the Grand Est region.

See also
 
 
 
 History of Alsace

Other cities in the Grand Est region:
 Timeline of Metz
 Timeline of Nancy, France
 Timeline of Reims
 Timeline of Strasbourg
 Timeline of Troyes

References

This article incorporates information from the French Wikipedia.

Bibliography

in English
 
 
 
 

in other languages
 
 
  (Bibliography)
 
 
  1895–

External links

 Items related to Mulhouse, various dates (via Europeana)
 Items related to Mulhouse, various dates (via Digital Public Library of America)

Mulhouse
Mulhouse
mulhouse